Épehy is a commune in the Somme department in Hauts-de-France in northern France. Valentine Fleming died there in 1917.

Geography

Population

Places of interest
 Saint Nicholas's church
 The mairie
 The war memorial

See also
Communes of the Somme department

References

External links

 Le site du village d'Epehy 
 Le site internet de la troupe Épyserit !  

Communes of Somme (department)